Ganapati Sastri (Telugu: గణపతి శాస్త్రి) is one of the Indian names.

 Ayyala Somayajula Ganapati Sastri, better known as Kavyakanta.
 Charla Ganapati Sastri, Vedic scholar and translator.
 Pilaka Ganapati Sastri, poet, translator and editor.
 T. Ganapati Sastri was a Sanskrit scholar, editor of the Trivandrum Sanskrit Series, and discovered the plays of Bhasa.
 Vuppuluri Ganapathi Sastry, Vedic scholar and the author of Veda Sara Ratnavali.